Macarostola thiasodes is a moth of the family Gracillariidae. It is known from Sri Lanka.

References

Macarostola
Moths described in 1912